Nara Television Co., Ltd. is a Japanese television and radio broadcaster founded in 1972 and headquartered in Nara, Japan.

References

Mass media in Nara, Nara